Joseph-André-Mathurin Jacrau (1698 - July 23, 1772) was a Canadian priest.

Born in the diocese of Angers, in France, Jacrau arrived in Canada some time before 1725.

External links
 

Roman Catholic priests in New France
French emigrants to pre-Confederation Quebec
1698 births
1772 deaths
Immigrants to New France